My Left Foot is a 1989 drama film about Irish writer Christy Brown. My Left Foot may also refer to:

 My Left Foot (book), an autobiography by Christy Brown

See also
 Christy Brown, the Irishman famous for My Left Foot
 "My Other Left Foot" (NCIS), a season 1 episode of NCIS: Washington TV series spin-off of JAG (TV series)
 "My Left and Right Foot", a season 8 episode of Full House